InterPride is the international organization that brings together Pride organizers from across the World to network, share knowledge, and maximize impact. To this end, Pride organizers design InterPride’s structure, programs, and initiatives, to better support them at the local, regional, and global levels. InterPride also owns the label WorldPride, which the membership licenses to a member organization through a direct vote.

History 

InterPride was incorporated as a 501(c)(3) non-profit organization in Texas in the 1980s. The organization was originally known as the National Association of Lesbian/Gay Pride Coordinators (NAL/GPC), before changing the name to International Association of Lesbian/Gay Pride Coordinators (IAL/GPC) in October 1985, the International Association of Lesbian, Gay, Bisexual and Transgender Pride Coordinators at the conference in West Hollywood, California, and eventually to InterPride in the late 1990s.

Formation of InterPride 
In April 1981, Pride Coordinators Rick Turner and Marsha H. Levine, from San Francisco and Boston respectively, met at a "call to unite" for a gay and lesbian leadership conference in Los Angeles, to start an organization then known as NOLAG (National Organization of Lesbians and Gays). While discussing common issues that their individual Pride organizations faced, and remarking that their connections with the New York Pride and Los Angeles Pride committees were helpful for problem-solving, Rick and Marsha felt this trading of information was important and could develop into a potential network.

More than a year later in August 1982, Levine sent out a call for the First Annual Conference of the National Association of Lesbian/Gay Pride Coordinators (NAL/GPC), to meet in Boston. Rick Turner (now deceased) declined joining in establishing the organization, due to his deteriorating health. With the aid of San Diego Pride Committee chairperson Doug Moore, who had been collecting a list of national pride organizations, and with small donations from the Los Angeles and Boston Pride Committees, the mailing list from Moore was used to distribute a self-mailing registration form designed and produced by Levine. Though many committees expressed an interest in attending, most didn't have the funds to send delegates at that time.

On October 9, 1982, in Hill House on Beacon Hill, members from the Boston, Chicago, Los Angeles, New York, San Diego, and San Francisco Pride committees gathered in response to Levine's mailing. Three long tables were pushed together to make a triangular seating area. For two days many topics concerning coordinating LGBT prides was discussed, and while each city had different events, they discovered much of the planning and logistics was surprisingly similar. They voted to hold a second conference in San Diego the next year.

Milestones

Membership 
As of October 26, 2022, InterPride includes 338 member organizations from 70 countries.

Annual General Meeting & World Conference 
During the last three decades, pride organizations from almost every continent have participated in InterPride's annual world conference.

The conference is held each year in a different city, with the location of upcoming conferences being voted on two years prior to their occurrence. To demonstrate a commitment to support and empower the global LGBTI+ Pride community, the conference is now frequently held outside North America.  Scholarships, through the Pamela O'Brien Memorial Scholarship Fund, are available for member organizations that cannot afford to attend. O'Brien was a longtime member of Cape Cod Pride in Massachusetts, USA and served InterPride as a Regional Director and Vice President of Operations.

In addition, several regional Pride networks hold their own conferences independent of InterPride.

WorldPride 

WorldPride, licensed by InterPride and organized by one of its members, is an event that promotes visibility and awareness of lesbian, gay, bisexual and transgender (LGBT pride) issues on an international level. WorldPride includes parades/marches, a human right conference, arts and culture festivals, and other activities.

At the 1997 world conference and general meeting InterPride members voted to award the inaugural WorldPride to be held in Rome in 2000. The host cities continue to be selected by the members of InterPride with WorldPrides usually held every two years.

Controversies
InterPride allegedly rolled back on a decision to name its upcoming event "WorldPride 2025, Taiwan" and instead proposed "WorldPride 2025, Kaohsiung" which sparked suspicion from the public that the name change is politically motivated. InterPride refuted this claim with the support of Taiwanese Pride organizers who were privy to the contract negotiation.

See also 
 WorldPride
 Europride
 List of LGBT events

References

External links 
  Official InterPride Web Site

International LGBT organizations
Non-profit organizations based in Texas
501(c)(3) organizations